T. V. Vijayarajan (7 September 1934 – 22 December 1997) was an Indian politician and MLA, who was one of the important leaders of the Kerala Revolutionary Socialist Party. He represented Karunagapally in the seventh Kerala Legislative Assembly.

References
 

1934 births
Kerala MLAs 1982–1987
Malayali politicians
1997 deaths